Kin-U is a town in the Sagaing Division in Myanmar. It is the administrative seat of Khin-U Township.

External links
"Kin-u Map — Satellite Images of Kin-u" Maplandia

Populated places in Sagaing Region
Township capitals of Myanmar